= Greizer Theaterherbst =

German theater festival

Greizer Theaterherbst is a theatre festival in Germany.
